Celia is a 1949 British comedy thriller film directed by Francis Searle and starring Hy Hazell, Bruce Lester and John Bailey. Made as a second feature by Hammer Films, it was based on a radio serial.

An unemployed actress is persuaded by her private detective boyfriend to pose as a housekeeper at a country mansion to investigate suspicious events occurring there.

Cast
 Hy Hazell as Celia  
 Bruce Lester as Larry Peters  
 John Bailey as Lester Martin  
 Elsie Wagstaff as Aunt Nora  
 Ferdy Mayne as Antonio  
 Lockwood West as Dr. Cresswell 
 John Sharp as Mr. Haldane 
 Joan Hickson as Mrs. Haldane  
 James Raglan as Inspector Parker  
 Jasmine Dee as Miss Arnold  
 June Elvin as Ruby  
 Charles Paton as Grocer  
 Olive Walter as Woman in shop  
 Grace Denbigh Russell as Woman in shop

References

Bibliography
 Chibnall, Steve & McFarlane, Brian. The British 'B' Film. Palgrave MacMillan, 2009.

External links

1949 films
British comedy thriller films
1940s comedy thriller films
Films directed by Francis Searle
Films set in England
Films based on radio series
Hammer Film Productions films
1949 comedy films
1940s English-language films
1940s British films